Zimbabwe Labour Party is a political party in Zimbabwe. It was founded in 1995. The party president is Langton Machoko. ZLP publishes Chimoto.

External links
Zimbabwe Labour Party (inactive website)

1995 establishments in Zimbabwe
Labour parties
Political parties established in 1995
Political parties in Zimbabwe